Stacie Mo'ana Mistysyn (born July 23, 1971) is an American-Canadian former actress best known for her work as Caitlin Ryan on Degrassi Junior High/Degrassi High, which ran from 1987 to 1991, and for reprising her role as Caitlin on Degrassi: The Next Generation, which ran from 2001 to 2015 and which she joined as a full-time cast member in 2003. Mistysyn also played Lisa Canard on the series' The Kids of Degrassi Street, which ran from 1979 to 1986.

Mistysyn was born in Los Angeles, California. She has dual citizenship as she was born in the United States to American parents but immigrated to Canada when she was a toddler to become Canadian citizens. In addition to acting, Mistysyn DJ'ed as "DJ Mistylicious" with fellow actress Amanda Stepto.

On August 29, 2009, she married actor James Gallanders.

Filmography
 The Kids of Degrassi Street (1982) (TV series) – Lisa Canard
 Degrassi Junior High (1987-1989) (TV series) – Caitlin Ryan
 Under the Umbrella Tree (1986) (TV series) – Megan (guest star)
 Princes in Exile (1990) (film) – Holly
 Degrassi High (1989-1991) (TV series) – Caitlin Ryan
 Degrassi Talks (1992) (TV series) – as herself
 School's Out (1992) (made-for-TV movie) – Caitlin Ryan
 X-Rated (1994) (made-for-TV movie) – River
 Degrassi: The Next Generation (TV series) – Caitlin Ryan (2001–2008)
 Jersey Guy (2003) (film) - Susan
 Degrassi: Next Class (TV series) – Caitlin Ryan (Reunion episodes, seasons 3–5)

References

External links

Stacie Mistysyn - Her Story
DJ Mistycious at The Annex WreckRoom

1971 births
Living people
20th-century Canadian actresses
21st-century Canadian actresses
21st-century Canadian women musicians
Actresses from Los Angeles
Actresses from Toronto
American emigrants to Canada
American expatriates in Canada
Best Actress in a Drama Series Canadian Screen Award winners
Canadian DJs
Canadian film actresses
Canadian people of Ukrainian descent
Canadian television actresses
Women DJs
Musicians from Los Angeles
Musicians from Toronto